Dún Ibhir (anglicised as Dooniver), meaning "Ibhir's stronghold", or "Ibhir's fort" is a Gaeltacht village on Achill Island in County Mayo, Ireland.

Geography

Dooniver is located on the east coast of Achill Island. Surrounding villages include Askill, The Valley: Tóin an tSeanbhaile and Bunnacurry. The townland of Dooniver is broken into a number of subsections, including Bullsmouth, Claddagh, Dooniver, The Brae, Baile na locha (Lakeside), Dionn, Áird Mhór, New Road and Sebastopol. 

Dooniver has a number of beaches including Dooniver strand and Bullsmouth Beach. Just off the village is the island of Innisbiggle.

Census

The following list taken from The Mayo County Council Website shows the population of the village in the years 1841-1921.

Facilities and amenities

Dooniver has a number of amenities, including a National School, hall, garage, plant hire, headstone maker and coffee shop. There is a bed and breakfast and caravan park. The village has one postbox, one bus stop and is served by Bus Éireann 440 once a day in each direction.

Education

Dooniver has a National School (founded in 1910). The National School was originally in Bullsmouth, but was later moved. Students had a choice of going to either McHale College or Scoil Damhnait which is located in Pollranny in the Achill area but now go to the new Colaiste Pobail Acla.

Sport
Dooniver Swifts played in the Mayo Association Football League during the 1950s. There is a GAA pitch in the area called St. Joseph's Park. Dooniver is a part of the St. Colman's (Dooniver, Askill, The Valley, Dugort and Dookinella) local GAA team and the 'DVDs' (Dooniver, The Valley, Dugort) soccer team. The professional boxer Johnny Kilbane has relatives in the village.

See also
 List of towns and villages in Ireland

Gallery

References

External links 
  The official Dooniver website
 Achill Tourism
 Logainm Dooniver
 Collins map of Dooniver

Villages in Achill Island
Gaeltacht places in County Mayo
Towns and villages in County Mayo
Gaeltacht towns and villages
Townlands of County Mayo
Articles on towns and villages in Ireland possibly missing Irish place names